Cynthia Greiner (née Suggs, born February 15, 1957, in San Diego, California) is a retired female heptathlete and long jumper from the United States, who won the gold medal at the 1987 Pan American Games in Indianapolis, United States. She is a two-time U.S. champion (1984 and 1990). Greiner set her personal best (6300 points) in the heptathlon during the 1992 Summer Olympics in Barcelona, Spain.

International competitions

External links
 
 
 
 Profile at trackfield.brinkster.net
 Athletes from the Past, Where Are They Now?, article in the Aberdeen News, July 5, 2008

1957 births
Living people
Track and field athletes from San Diego
American heptathletes
American female long jumpers
Olympic track and field athletes of the United States
Athletes (track and field) at the 1984 Summer Olympics
Athletes (track and field) at the 1988 Summer Olympics
Athletes (track and field) at the 1992 Summer Olympics
Pan American Games track and field athletes for the United States
Pan American Games gold medalists for the United States
Pan American Games medalists in athletics (track and field)
Athletes (track and field) at the 1983 Pan American Games
Athletes (track and field) at the 1987 Pan American Games
World Athletics Championships athletes for the United States
Medalists at the 1983 Pan American Games
Medalists at the 1987 Pan American Games
21st-century American women